HEB may refer to:
 H-E-B, a North American supermarket chain
 Epistle to the Hebrews
 Hebei, a province of China (Guobiao abbreviation HEB)
 Hebrew language
 Hemispherx Biopharma, an American pharmaceutical company
 Hindu Endowments Board of Singapore
 High Energy Biscuits
 New Hebrides national football team
 Volkswagen Type 14A (Hebmüller Cabriolet), an automobile
 Hot electron bolometer, a type of bolometer
 A collective acronym for the neighboring cities of Hurst, Euless and Bedford, Texas within the Dallas-Fort Worth Metroplex.
 The Hurst-Euless-Bedford Independent School District, which serves the three aforementioned cities.
 HEB – European type of I-beam